is a Japanese politician who was the Governor of Niigata Prefecture between 2004 and 2016.

Personal history 
 September 15, 1962: Born in Kamo in Niigata Prefecture.
 1981: Graduated from Sanjo High School.
 1987: Graduated from Kyoto University Law Department.
 1987: Entered the Ministry of Economy, Trade and Industry.
 1994: Attended the University of British Columbia as a visiting researcher.
 2003: Appointed Head of the Gifu Prefecture Industrial Labor Bureau.
 2004: Elected Governor of Niigata Prefecture. 2 days before taking office, the Niigata Chūetsu earthquake occurs, overshadowing his first year in office.

External links 
 Greetings from the Governor of Niigata Prefecture

1962 births
Living people
People from Niigata Prefecture
Kyoto University alumni
Governors of Niigata Prefecture
Members of the House of Representatives (Japan)

Politicians from Niigata Prefecture